Herzig may refer to:

People with the surname
 Aiko Herzig-Yoshinaga (1925-2018), American activist
 Arno Herzig (born 1937), German historian from Wambierzyce, Silesia
 Charles Edwin Herzig, US Roman Catholic bishop
 Christopher Herzig, (1926-1993) British civil servant
 Denny Herzig (born 1984, Pößneck), German footballer with Rot-Weiss Essen
 Edmund Herzig (born 1958), British iranologist
 Édouard Herzig (1860–1926), Swiss painter, drawer and illustrator who lived in French Algeria
 Ernst Herzig (born 1943), Austrian politician, mayor of Breitenfurt bei Wien
 Eva Herzig (born 1972), Austrian actress
 Friedrich Herzig (1915–1954), Sturmbannführer (Major) in the Waffen SS
 Heinrich Herzig (1887–1964), Swiss painter
 Josef Herzig (1853–1924), Jewish Austrian chemist
 Katie Herzig (born 1980), US singer/songwriter
 Mark Herzig, American cinematographer
 Monika Herzig (born 1964), German-American jazz pianist
 Nico Herzig (born 1983), German footballer
 Sig Herzig (1897–1985), American screenwriter and playwright

See also 
 Herzig-Meyer alkimide group determination, a chemical test
 Eva Herzigová (born 1973, Litvínov)
 Yitzhak Artzi, born Izo Hertzig
 Herz (disambiguation)
 Hertz (disambiguation)
 Hertzog (disambiguation)

German-language surnames
Jewish surnames